Johann Spenner also Johann Spender (died 5 December 1503) was a Roman Catholic prelate who served as Auxiliary Bishop of Cologne (1482–1503).

Biography
Johann Spenner was appointed a priest in the Order of Friars Minor. On 4 November 1482, he was appointed during the papacy of Pope Sixtus IV as Auxiliary Bishop of Cologne and Titular Bishop of Cyrene. On 18 November 1482, he was consecrated bishop by Stefan Teglatije, Archbishop of Bar, with Giuliano Maffei, Bishop of Bertinoro, serving as co-consecrator. He served as Auxiliary Bishop of Cologne until his death on 5 December 1503.

References

External links and additional sources
 (for Chronology of Bishops) 
 (for Chronology of Bishops)  
 (for Chronology of Bishops) 
 (for Chronology of Bishops)  

15th-century German Roman Catholic bishops
16th-century German Roman Catholic bishops
Bishops appointed by Pope Sixtus IV
1503 deaths
Franciscan bishops